Andreas Kuen (born 24 March 1995) is an Austrian professional footballer who plays as a right midfield for Greek Super League club Atromitos.

Club career
Kuen made his league debut on 21 July 2012 in Austrian Bundesliga match against Rapid Wien.

On 8 August 2020, he signed a two-year contract with Sturm Graz.

On 21 June 2022, Kuen joined Atromitos until the summer of 2024.

International career
Kuen has represented his country at various age groups, most recently for the Austria national under-19 football team.

Career statistics

References

External links
 

1995 births
People from Zams
Living people
Association football midfielders
Austrian footballers
Austrian expatriate footballers
Austria youth international footballers
FC Wacker Innsbruck (2002) players
SK Rapid Wien players
Floridsdorfer AC players
SV Mattersburg players
SK Sturm Graz players
Atromitos F.C. players
Austrian Football Bundesliga players
2. Liga (Austria) players
Super League Greece players
Footballers from Tyrol (state)
Expatriate footballers in Greece
Austrian expatriate sportspeople in Greece